¡Santiago! (or ¡Santiago y cierra, España!), is a Christian rallying cry of Spanish soldiers during the Reconquista and crusading era of medieval Spain. The phrase, "¡Santiago y cierra España!" — literally, "St. James and Seal Spain!" or "Santiago and close, Spain!" was an appeal to St. James to intercede in closing Spain's borders from foreign bodies and invasion. Contrary to this interpretation there are other authors who argue that the military order closes, in military terms means to engage in combat, attack or attack; "Close" the distance between you and the enemy.
St. James became the patron of Spain, and the hope and the mainstay of the Christian people in times of stress, war and threatening ruin.

Origins

The first reported usage of the war cry was during the ninth century, where St. James was purported to have appeared to King Ramiro I of Asturias (842-850) prior to the battle of Clavijo where he encouraged and assured the Christian king of victory, stating: 
 

"I will come to your aid and on the morrow by the hand of God you will overcome the countless multitude of Saracens... You will see me on a white horse... bearing a great white banner."  

As promised, the Apostle James appeared on horseback and the Spanish troops shouted, "May God and St. James help us!"                  

Thus, it was during this conflict that the battle cry of St. James originated. The association of St. James with intervening in battle evolved during the medieval era and reconquest of Spain. As such, the concepts of St. James and warfare became tightly interwoven (ie: Santiago as Matamoros or the Moor-slayer). By the twelfth and thirteenth centuries, the appeals of Spanish soldiers and crusaders requesting assistance from God, the Virgin Mary or diverse Catholic Saints prior to engaging in battle with Muslim armies were common place and well attested to, as adduced in the epic poem of Cantar de mio Cid, 731:                                 

 "Los Moros llaman Mafomat e los Cristianos Santi Yague."    
 "The Moors call on Muhammad, and the Christians on Santiago."         

In the heat of battle, war cries were customary occurrences and although there are a variety of battle cries used throughout the history of the Reconquista, (eg: "St. Mary and Santiago!" or "Castilla!" or "Castilla and King Alfonso!" or "Santa Maria!")  the most enduring rallying cry of the reconquest of Spain was "¡Santiago y cierra, España!"

References

Battle cries
Military history of Spain
Spanish traditions
Medieval Spain
Spanish words and phrases